Gérard Zingg (7 June 1942 – 27 July 2021) was a French painter, screenwriter, and film director.

Biography
Zingg studied cinema at the Institut des hautes études cinématographiques. In 1977, he directed the film At Night All Cats Are Crazy, which starred Gérard Depardieu. He subsequently planned to direct the film L'Autobus de la haine, which was based on a comic strip by Fred, although it was never created. In 1998, he directed , a Franco-Ivorian film based on a comic of the same name by Francesco Tullio Altan.

Along with his film career, Zingg dedicated himself to painting and exhibited his works in France and abroad. He also published several poetry collections.

Gérard Zingg died in Gramat on 27 July 2021 at the age of 79.

Filmography

Director
At Night All Cats Are Crazy (1977)
 (1988)
Yéti (2008)

Screenwriter
 (1969)
At Night All Cats Are Crazy (1977)
Alfred et Marie (1978)
 (1981)
Ada dans la jungle (1988)
 (2008)

Actor
Young Tiger (2014)

Assistant director
Going Places (1973)
 (1974)

Publications
Loup où es-tu (1999)
Poèmes pour la conquête d'un vertige (2004)

Expositions
"Extravaganza" (Galerie Phantom Projects Contemporary, Marigny-le-Châtel, 2013–2014)
"Small is beautiful 3" (Le Cabinet d'amateur, Paris, 2013)

References

1942 births
2021 deaths
20th-century French painters
French screenwriters
French film directors
People from Montfermeil
21st-century French painters